Mark Bittner (born November 29, 1951 in Vancouver, Washington) is an American writer. He is the author of The Wild Parrots of Telegraph Hill, the book which accompanies the film The Wild Parrots of Telegraph Hill.

Bittner spent 14 years on the streets of San Francisco after his dream of becoming a professional musician fell apart. After many years of doing odd jobs while maintaining a The Dharma Bums-type lifestyle, he found a flock of naturalized parrots (mostly cherry-headed conures, also known as red-masked parakeets) in the area of Telegraph Hill.

His book, The Wild Parrots of Telegraph Hill, and the documentary of the same name, by Judy Irving, describe that encounter and the relationship he formed with the birds.   In 2006, Judy married Mark Bittner after the two fell in love during the filming of Parrots.

Bittner later concluded that human feeding of the wild birds in parks (as opposed to backyard feeders) was a bad idea. He was among those who persuaded the San Francisco Board of Supervisors to pass an ordinance prohibiting the practice.

Bittner is a member of the South End Rowing Club.

References

External links 

 THE WILD PARROTS OF TELEGRAPH HILL site for Independent Lens on PBS
 Official page of Documentary Movie
 
An excerpt from "The Wild Parrots of Telegraph Hill A Love Story ... with Wings," by Mark Bittner

1951 births
Living people
American memoirists
Writers from Vancouver, Washington
Writers from San Francisco